The system of Vietnamese military ranks was originally introduced on 22 March 1946 by President Ho Chi Minh, originally based on the military ranks system of Japanese military. Reference designs to the military ranks system of the French military. In 1958, the Vietnam People's Army military ranks system was changed, and has no Marshal or General of the Army or Brigadier General. In contrast, the Colonel General, Senior Colonel or Senior Lieutenant in Vietnam at present do not exist in many countries.

Origins

According to the decree No-33 on 22 March 1946 signed by President Ho Chi Minh, the ranks of the Vietnamese National Army (former name of the Vietnam People's Army since 1950) were ordered to be as follows:

1. General level (3 ranks):
 General: 3 gold stars on red background
 Lieutenant General: 2 gold stars on red background
 Major General: 1 gold stars on red background

2. Field Grade level (3 ranks):
 Colonel: 3 yellow chevrons and 1 gold star on red background
 Lieutenant Colonel: 2 yellow chevrons and 1 gold star on red background
 Major: 1 yellow chevrons and 1 gold star on red background

3. Company Grade level (4 ranks):
 Captain: 3 yellow chevrons on red background
 Lieutenant: 2 yellow chevrons on red background
 Second lieutenant: 1 yellow chevrons on red background
 Warrant-officer: yellow on red background

4. Non-Commissioned level (3 ranks):
 Sergeant major: (symbol) red on yellow background
 Sergeant: (symbol) red on yellow background
 Corporal: (symbol) red on yellow background

5. Enlisted level (2 ranks):
 Private 1st class: (symbol) red on light-yellow background
 Private: no rank insignia

However, due to war conditions, the ranks system had not been applied, except for few exceptions. The rank system was changed to the current one in 1958, and several rank changes have occurred since their adoption.

The adoption of the 1958 rank system and some changes
 1958
With the official adoption of the armed forces rank system in 1958, the VPA has three levels of ranks: General Officers, Field Grade Officers,  and Company Grade Officers, and each level has four steps are classified by number of stars: 4 stars, 3 stars, 2 stars and 1 star; specially, Company Grade officers have one more rank which is that of Warrant-officer (professional officer).

Below the Commissioned Officers level are the Non-Commissioned Officers level and Soldiers and Students levels. Non-Commissioned level have 3 steps: Sergeant major, Sergeant and Corporal. Soldiers have 2 ranks: Private 1st class and Private. Until 1982 the Vietnam People's Navy used the same ranks as the rest of the armed forces.

 1982
Senior Colonel rank was officially abolished.

The following naval ranks were officially adopted for flag-level officers of the Vietnam People's Navy: Admiral (equivalent to Colonel General), Vice Admiral (equivalent to Lieutenant General), and Rear Admiral (equivalent to Major General). With this change the English language translations of the Vietnamese ranks of the VPN after the 1982 flag officer rank introduction are as follows (with their equivalent land-based ranks in parenthesis):

 Ensign (Junior Lieutenant)
 Lieutenant Junior Grade (Lieutenant)
 Lieutenant (Senior Lieutenant)
 Captain Lieutenant (Captain)
 Lieutenant Commander (Major)
 Commander (Lieutenant Colonel)
 Captain (Colonel)

Regulations on professional officer ranks were amended, and the ranks were formalised from being Officer Cadet/Warrant Officer (lowest) to Colonel/Captain (highest).

 1992
The Senior Colonel rank was restored, and the Commodore rank was adopted in the VPN.

 1996
Ranks of the Border Defence Force were formally decreed to use the same ones used by the Army with dark-green background and red piping. The shoulder boards of all officers, NCOs and enlisted personnel formally changed to their present design.

 1998
Coast Guard ranks and ratings were defined with dark-purple and yellow background.

 2008
New regulations on military rank insignias with some improvements were officially issued.

Professional officers also use the straight metal chevron but have a pink stripe running between the shoulderboards to differentiate.

General and flag officer's shoulderboards are woven with floating Dong Son drums and flamingos. Field Grade ranks have woven lines just like the old Generals' shoulderboards.

Current official ranks
Ranks can show information about the branch of service of personnel within the PAVN. Color of the ranks reflect the service branch.

The Service shoulder colours are:

 Army: red
 Air Force: azure
 Navy: dark blue

Army-Air Force-Navy ranks have gold backgrounds for officers and a red stripe for staff officers.

Border Defence Force's ranks have background is dark-green and border colour is red.

The Coast Guard's ranks have background is blue and border colour is yellow.

See also
 Vietnamese military ranks and insignia

References 

Military history of Vietnam
People's Army of Vietnam
Vietnam